Marcus Sorg (born 24 December 1965) is a German football manager and former player.

Career

Early career

Sorg has been head coach of lower division clubs including Stuttgarter Kickers II, Stuttgarter Kickers 1. FC Heidenheim, and Ulm 1846.

SC Freiburg

Sorg took over for Robin Dutt as head coach of Bundesliga side SC Freiburg when Dutt left for Bayer Leverkusen and had his first practice on 20 June 2011. On 29 December 2011, Sorg was sacked due to lack of results.

Germany national team
Between 2013 and 2016, Sorg was the head coach of the Germany national under-19 team, winning the 2014 UEFA European Under-19 Championship while in charge of the side.

On 18 March 2016, he joined the Germany senior national team as second assistant coach to Joachim Löw, and following the 2018 FIFA World Cup was promoted to first assistant.

References

1965 births
Living people
Sportspeople from Ulm
German football managers
Stuttgarter Kickers managers
SSV Ulm 1846 managers
SC Freiburg managers
FC Bayern Munich non-playing staff